Ritu  is a 2009 Indian Malayalam-language film directed by Shyamaprasad. The original screenplay was written by Joshua Newtonn. It was the first time Shyamaprasad made a film based on an original screenplay, all of his previous films were adaptations of published novels or plays. It is now widely acclaimed as the 'coming of age' of Malayalam cinema.

Plot
Ritu is about three youngsters growing up together and betraying each other. The story follows the lives of three childhood friends: Sunny Immatty (Asif Ali), Sarath Varma (Nishan K. P. Nanaiah), Varsha John (Rima Kallingal). The trio were almost inseparable as friends; they grew up in the same neighborhood in their love, bonding and innocence. They shared a dream of journeying together in life forever.

Sarath leaves for the United States to help his brother-in-law with his business. He also aspires to write a book some day. But still he clings on to the memories of the good old days with his friends and wishes to reunite and work with them again. So, after three years, he comes back to India and starts a small company with Varsha and Sunny to initiate an ambitious new project. But he soon finds out that their strong bond of friendship has almost vanished: Varsha and Sunny's lifestyles and mindsets have changed over the years. Varsha flirts with men over the phone while, Sunny is interested in only earning money by hook or crook. Whether their friendship will return or deteriorate even more forms rest of the movie.

Cast
Nishan K. P. Nanaiah as Sarath Varma
Asif Ali as Sunny Emmatty
Rima Kallingal as Varsha John
K. Govindankutty as Rama Varma (Sarath's father)
M. G. Sasi as Hari Varma (Sarath's Brother)
Jaya Menon as Zarina Balu
Prakash Menon as Balu
Manu Jose as Jithu
Siddharth as Pranchi
Kalamandhalam Radhika as Sarath's mother
Vinay Forrt as Jamal
Shyamnath Ravindranath
Satthya

Soundtrack

The original score and songs were composed, arranged, programmed and produced by Rahul Raj, with lyrics penned by Rafeeq Ahammed. Rahul Raj won the Kerala State Film Award for Best Background Music for his work.

Release and reception
Four years after the release of the movie, and an avalanche of new-gen films, critics have begun to acclaim Ritu as the pioneer of 'new wave' in Malayalam cinema. Upon the release, Ritu received generally positive reviews but mild response in theatres. Nowrunning.com sees Ritu as a sensitive, melancholic portrayal of tumultuous emotions that ravage three young minds basking on the pinnacle of success. "It is an engrossing, intricate slice-of-life that deftly captures the nuances of growing up together and finally growing apart." Rediff and Indiaglitz reviewers termed it as a worthwhile experiment and said that it represents the changing face of Malayalam cinema.

The acting skills of the three lead actors have been applauded: the newcomers did their part quite convincingly. Indiaglitz review said "It's high time for Mollywood film goers to change and  settle down from the regular potboilers and applaud films like Ritu which has its heart exactly at the right place". Rediff said "Ritu is a worthwhile experiment by seasoned director Shyamaprasad with a predominantly new team".

The Telugu version of Ritu, titled New, was released under two banners: Bhargava Pictures and Innostorm entertainment.

References

External links

Films scored by Rahul Raj
2000s Malayalam-language films
Films directed by Shyamaprasad
Indian LGBT-related films